USC&GS Discoverer was the name of two ships of the United States Coast and Geodetic Survey, and may refer to:

 , a survey ship in service from 1922 to 1941

Ships of the United States Coast and Geodetic Survey